Sidney Evrard Viérin Obissa (born 4 May 2000) is a Gabonese professional footballer who plays as a defender for  club Villefranche on loan from Ajaccio and the Gabon national team.

Club career
On 7 March 2020, Obissa signed his first professional contract with Ajaccio. On 1 September 2021, he joined Belgian third-tier club Olympic Charleroi on loan. On 11 August 2022, Obissa was loaned by Villefranche.

International career
Obissa debuted with the Gabon national team in a friendly 2–0 friendly loss to Benin on 12 October 2020. Obissa featured for Gabon national team in the 2021 AFCON tournament in Cameroon.

References

External links
 
 

2000 births
Living people
Sportspeople from Libreville
Gabonese footballers
Association football defenders
Gabon international footballers
AC Ajaccio players
R. Olympic Charleroi Châtelet Farciennes players
FC Villefranche Beaujolais players
Belgian National Division 1 players
Championnat National 3 players
Gabonese expatriate footballers
Gabonese expatriate sportspeople in France
Expatriate footballers in France
Gabonese expatriate sportspeople in Belgium
Expatriate footballers in Belgium
21st-century Gabonese people
2021 Africa Cup of Nations players